Hallow is an American Catholic meditation and prayer app owned by Hallow, Inc.

Hallow app provides audio-guided Bible stories, prayers, meditations, sleep, and Christian music. Other features include community challenges and daily prayers such as the Catholic practice of Lectio Divina, curated music, praylists, and options to set prayer routines.

Hallow is based in Chicago, Illinois in the United States. Alex Jones is the chief executive officer (CEO) of the company.

History
Hallow was founded by Alex Jones, Erich Kerekes, and Alessandro DiSanto in December 2018. Alex Jones, who grew up as a Catholic, lost his faith as a teenager. With the use of meditation, Jones chose to revert to Catholicism and made the decision to create a platform to assist others in a similar situation.

In January 2022, the app was launched in the Spanish language.

As of February 2022, the app has been downloaded more than two million times. Hallow's subscription is available in two tiers: monthly and yearly.

In June 2022, Hallow started the I am Here Eucharist campaign in partnership with the Roman Catholic Archdiocese of Detroit.

References

Android (operating system) software
iOS software
Companies based in Chicago
American companies established in 2018